"Where the Dream Takes You" is a song by American singer Mya. It was written by songwriter Diane Warren and composer James Newton Howard to promote Walt Disney Pictures' 41st animated feature film Atlantis: The Lost Empire (2001). Produced by Jay Selvester, Robbie Buchanan and Ron Fair, the song was released as the only promotional single from the film's soundtrack on June 5, 2001.

Directors Kirk Wise and Gary Trousdale agreed that Atlantis: The Lost Empire, their third animated Disney project, would not be a musical. However, the studio's marketing department insisted that at least one song be featured during the film's end credits in order to adhere to tradition. Disney hired Mya to record a pop song for the Atlantis soundtrack because of the studio and singer's shared business relationship with A&M/Interscope Records. A "tender" pop ballad, "Where the Dream Takes You" is an inspirational song about following one's heart and self-discovery, which alludes to the film's central plot about a young adventurer's search for the lost city of Atlantis. Both Warren and Howard collaborated on the song's melody, which borrows from Howard's own orchestral score, while Warren wrote the lyrics.

"Where the Dream Takes You" is the only song from Atlantis: The Lost Empire that features both music and lyrics. Upon its release 10 days ahead of the film, the ballad was criticized for sounding generic and uninspired. Some critics also questioned Disney's decision to have Mya to record the song, believing the single would have benefited from a more experienced vocalist. However, the song was nominated for Best Original Song Written Directly for a Film at the World Soundtrack Awards.

Background and writing 

Unlike most of Disney's animated releases, Atlantis: The Lost Empire lacks both songs and musical numbers to assist with its storytelling. After having successfully directed two Disney musicals consecutively, Kirk Wise and Gary Trousdale agreed that Atlantis: The Lost Empire, their third animated project for Disney, would not be a musical, nor would it feature any power ballads. However, by the time the film was released in 2001, it had become standard practice for Disney to hire young artists to record pop songs for their films' official soundtrack albums, thus Disney's marketing department insisted that Atlantis: The Lost Empire feature at least one song during its closing credits as a compromise in order to maintain tradition. Earlier that year, the releases of The Mummy Returns and Pearl Harbor had also been accompanied by pop songs to attract a wider audience, a trend Disney would follow with Atlantis. 

Chuck Taylor of Billboard believes that Disney recruited R&B singer Mya because of the studio's professional relationship with the artist's then-record company A&M/Interscope Records. At that time, Mya had recently collaborated with singers Pink, Lil' Kim and Christina Aguilera on "Lady Marmalade" for the Moulin Rouge! soundtrack earlier that year, the lattermost of whom made her musical debut recording "Reflection", the theme song from Disney's Mulan (1998). Rob Burch of The Hollywood News believes that "Where the Dream Takes You" was initially intended to benefit Mya's career similar to the way in which "Reflection" had bolstered Aguilera's.

"Where the Dream Takes You" was written by songwriter Diane Warren and film composer James Newton Howard.  While Howard, who scored the entire film, composed the song's melody, Warren contributed to the song's music while writing its lyrics on her own. On the co-writing process, Howard explained that Warren wrote lyrics to accompany "a musical theme" he had composed, in addition to making some musical contributions of her own. Therefore, while both Warren and Howard are credited as composers, only Warren retains a lyric writing credit. By then already well known for writing several commercially successful songs for various artists, Warren had already established herself as a prolific songwriter by the time she wrote "Where the Dream Takes You", which lyrically adheres to a similar songwriting style for which she has become known. Meanwhile, the song's melody is loosely based on a sample of the film's orchestral score. Played during the film's end titles, "Where the Dream Takes You" is the only song from the film that features both music and lyrics, although it is not performed by any character within the context of the film itself because Atlantis: The Lost Empire is not a musical.

Release 
Distinguished from most film soundtracks, Atlantis: The Lost Empire features "Where the Dream Takes You" as its first track instead of its last. A&M/Interscope Records, Mya's record company at the time, and Walt Disney Records released "Where the Dream Takes You" as the only promotional single from the Atlantis: The Lost Empire soundtrack. It was sent to Top 40 and adult contemporary radio stations on June 5, 2001 to support the film ten days ahead of its June 15 theatrical release date. The single was accompanied by a music video starring Mya, in which she performs the song interpolated with scenes from the film. "Where the Dream Takes You" appears as the first track on the soundtrack before it is succeeded by Howard's orchestral score, which accounts for the remainder of the album. Puerto Rican singer Chayanne covered the song in Spanish, entitled "Donde Va Tu Sueño", to promote the film's Latin American release. Recorded in Buenos Aires, Argentina, Chayanne co-wrote his rendition's Spanish lyrics with Renato Lopez, Walterio Pesqueira and Manny Benito. The two-disc Taiwanese release of the soundtrack includes three additional versions of "Where the Dream Takes You" performed in three different languages by three different artists: Jolin Tsai in Mandarin, Joey Yong in Cantonese, and Kangta in Korean.

Composition 
"Where the Dream Takes You" is a "tender" pop power ballad, with "average pop fare". According to the song's official sheet music, published by Walt Disney Music Publishing on Musicnotes.com, "Where the Dream Takes You" is set in signature common time and performed at a moderate tempo of 88 beats per minute in the key of C major. The Disney Song Encyclopedia author Thomas S. Hischak believes that the song's lyrics are "about following your heart to find your true self", which begin "They'll try to hold you back, they will say you're wrong, but they will never understand, no, the journey that you're on." A writer for Barnes & Noble agreed that, thematically, the single "correlates to the film's tale of an inexperienced young adventurer", Milo Thatch, and its diverse cast of supporting characters, all of whom long to follow various dreams of their own as they search for Atlantis. One of its verses reads, "There's something in your soul/That won't be denied/It's the faith to dream that keeps the dream alive/So you still believe and you know you must go", encouraging listeners to follow their dreams despite others' opinions. Lasting a duration of four minutes, AllMusic cites the song's mood as both "earnest" and "mellow"; Mya performs it using a "sweet vocal", which spans two octaves from G3 to D♭5. Based on a melody heard only briefly during the film, "Where the Dream Takes You" encompasses "soft, contemporary beats" combined with the singer's "dulcet tones" that recall music played in a piano lounge, contrasting with the time period in which the film itself is set. Its production, which has been described as "polished", was handled by Jay Selvester, Robbie Buchanan and Ron Fair.

Critical reception
Ultimately, "Where the Dream Takes You" was both a commercial and critical disappointment despite Disney's efforts; the song has been met with generally negative reviews from music critics, who dismissed it as standard and uninspired. Although AllMusic's Jonathan Widran believed the song could potentially become a "pop hit", he ultimately dismissed it as "fairly generic Diane Warren-written fare." In Billboard, radio personality Charles Karel Bouley agreed that the song is "average pop fare" while acknowledging its Top 40 potential. Film Score Monthly's Lukas Kendall strongly disliked the ballad, writing, "The less said about ...'Where the Dream Takes You,' the better." James Barry of Soundtrack.Net wrote, "If I had to pick something to dislike, it'd be the song 'Where the Dream Takes You'" because "it suffers from sounding like so much other disposable end-credits music." Telenet's Thomas Glorieux opined that the track "fails to even stir up the attention because I find it a very ordinary song."

Critics were also unimpressed with Mya's performance. Calling the singer "a curious choice" for "Where the Dream Takes You", Chuck Taylor of Billboard criticized Mya's vocals for failing "to lift the ballad beyond the mundane, while making it more than obvious that her talents are best-suited for uptempo, beat-heavy fare", and believes the single could have potentially benefited from a more powerful, seasoned vocalist. Ranking "Where the Dream Takes You" among Disney's worst songs, Consequence of Sound's Dominick Suzanne-Mayer panned the ballad as "an addendum every bit as forgettable ... as the film in which it appears." "Where the Dream Takes You" was nominated for Best Original Song Written Directly for a Film at the World Soundtrack Awards in 2001.

Live performances
To promote "Where the Dream Takes You," Mya performed the song at several media outlets. On the film's release day, June 15, 2001, Mya performed the song at Live with Regis & Kelly. Next, Mya performed the song at the event gala, An American Celebration at Ford's Theatre. Hosted by ABC journalist Sam Donaldson, the show originally tapped June 10, 2001 and featured a line-up of entertainers which included country singer Billy Gilman, country group SHeDAISY, comedian Jeff Foxworthy and opera singer Russell Watson. It aired August 21, 2001.

References

2001 singles
Mýa songs
Songs written for animated films
Songs written by Diane Warren
Songs written by James Newton Howard
Disney songs
Atlantis: The Lost Empire
2001 songs
Walt Disney Records singles
Interscope Records singles
Pop ballads
Contemporary R&B ballads
2000s ballads
Song recordings produced by Robbie Buchanan